A Single Sky is the 30th album by Dave Douglas.  It was released on the Greenleaf Music label in 2009 and features Douglas with Grammy-winning arranger/conductor Jim McNeely and the Frankfurt Radio Bigband. It is notable for being Dave Douglas's first big band album.

Reception
The Allmusic review by Michael G. Nastos awarded the album 4 stars stating "it's another large feather in the cap for Douglas, the most widely revered progressive jazz musician to appear in the past 20 years, and for many great reasons".

Track list
 The Presidents (comp/arr. – Douglas) – 9:33
 Bury Me Standing (comp. – Douglas/arr. – McNeely) – 9:58
 A Single Sky (comp. – Douglas/arr. – McNeely) – 11:12
 Campaign Trail (comp/arr. – Douglas) – 8:56
 Tree and Shrub (comp. – Douglas/arr. – McNeely) – 5:02
 Persistence of Memory (comp. – Douglas/arr. – McNeely) – 11:10
 Blockbuster (comp/arr. – Douglas) – 6:43

Personnel
Dave Douglas – trumpet
Frankfurt Radio Big Band - Jim McNeely – conductor

References

2009 albums
Dave Douglas (trumpeter) albums
Greenleaf Music albums